Ernst Badian (8 August 1925 – 1 February 2011) was an Austrian-born classical scholar who served as a professor at Harvard University from 1971 to 1998.

Early life and education 
Badian was born in Vienna in 1925 and in 1938 fled the Nazis with his family to New Zealand. There he attended the University of Canterbury, Christchurch (then Canterbury College), where he met his future wife Nathlie Ann Wimsett.  He received a BA in 1945 and an MA the following year.

After a year teaching at the Victoria University of Wellington, Badian went to University College, Oxford, where he studied under George Cawkwell, gained a first class BA in Litt Hum in 1950, an MA in 1954 and a DPhil in 1956.  In addition, he gained the degree of LittD from New Zealand's Victoria University of Wellington in 1962.

Academic career
After teaching in the universities of Sheffield, Durham, and Leeds in England and at the State University of New York, Buffalo, he was appointed to Harvard's Department of History in 1971 and was cross-appointed to the Department of the Classics in 1973. He became John Moors Cabot Professor of History Emeritus in 1998.

An active promoter of classical studies in the United States, Badian helped found The American Journal of Ancient History (1976), the Association of Ancient Historians (1974), and the New England Ancient History Colloquium.

Honours
Badian was elected a fellow of the American Academy of Arts and Sciences in 1974.

In 1999 Austria awarded him the Cross of Honor for Science and Art (Österreichische Ehrenkreuz für Wissenschaft und Kunst). The same year, the University of Canterbury awarded him an honorary degree.

Personal life and death
Badian died at the age of 85 after a fall in his home in Quincy, Massachusetts.  He was survived by his widow Nathlie, his children Hugh and Rosemary, and several grandchildren and great-grandchildren.

Legacy
The Ernst Badian Collection of Roman Republican Coins is housed by the Special Collections and University Archives of the Rutgers University libraries.

At the 2012 meeting of the Association of Ancient Historians in Chapel Hill, North Carolina, ancient historians T. Corey Brennan and Jerzy Linderski delivered papers reflecting on the historical methodologies employed by Badian.

Works
 Foreign Clientelae 264–70 B.C. (Clarendon Press, Oxford, 1958), based on his 1956 dissertation
 Studies in Greek and Roman History (Blackwell, Oxford, 1964)
"The Early Historians", in Thomas Allen Dorey (editor), Latin Historians (Basic Books, New York, 1966) pp. 1–38.
 Roman Imperialism in the Late Republic, 2nd ed. (1st commercial ed.) (Blackwell, Oxford/Cornell University Press, 1968)
 Publicans and Sinners (Blackwell, Oxford/Cornell University Press, 1972, reprinted, with corrections and critical bibliography, Cornell University Press, 1983)
 From Plataea to Potidaea (Johns Hopkins University Press, 1993)
 Zöllner und Sünder (Wissenschaftliche Buchgesellschaft, Darmstadt, 1997)

Editor for:
 Ancient Society and Institutions. Studies Presented to Victor Ehrenberg (Blackwell, Oxford, 1966)
 Polybius. Selected passages in translation (Washington Square Press, NY, 1966)
 Sir Ronald Syme, Roman Papers (vols. 1 & 2) (Oxford University Press, 1979)
 Translated Documents of Greek and Rome, vols. 1, 2, 3, edited jointly with Robert K. Sherk (Johns Hopkins University Press, then Cambridge University Press)

Further reading
 Andreas W. Daum, "Refugees from Nazi Germany as Historians: Origins and Migrations, Interests and Identities," The Second Generation: Émigrés from Nazi Germany as Historians. With a Biobibliographic Guide, ed. Andreas W. Daum, Hartmut Lehmann, and James J. Sheehan. New York: Berghahn Books, 2016, 1‒52.
 Transitions to Empire: Essays in Greco-Roman History; 360‒146 B.C. in Honor of E. Badian. Ed. Robert W. Wallace and Edward M. Harris. Norman: Univ. of Oklahoma Press, 1996, .
 The Legacy of Ernst Badian, ed. Carol G. Thomas. Erie, PA: Association of Ancient Historians, 2013, .

References

External links

 
 Harvard page on Badian
 "Ernst Badian, professor of history emeritus, 85" ''Harvard Gazette February 14, 2011
 "Ernst Badian, 85, noted scholar on ancient Rome" Boston Globe May 23, 2011
 "d.m. Ernst Badian" FEBRUARY 4, 2011 / DAVID MEADOWS ~ ROGUECLASSICIST

1925 births
2011 deaths
University of Canterbury alumni
Alumni of University College, Oxford
Austrian emigrants to New Zealand
Fellows of the American Academy of Arts and Sciences
State University of New York faculty
Prosopographers of ancient Rome
Classical scholars of the University of Durham
Classical scholars of the University of Leeds
Classical scholars of the State University of New York
Classical scholars of Harvard University
Latin epigraphers
Historians of ancient Rome
Scholars of ancient Greek history
Members of the Austrian Academy of Sciences
Academics of the University of Sheffield
Academics of Durham University
Academics of the University of Leeds